Paul Robert Holmes (born 16 January 1957) is a politician in the United Kingdom. He was the Liberal Democrat Member of Parliament for Chesterfield, previously held by Tony Benn, from 2001 to 2010.

Early life
He grew up in Sheffield on a council estate. He went to Prince Edward Primary School, Manor Top, then Firth Park Secondary School (now Firth Park Community Arts College), a comprehensive from 1969 (when he was 12).

Career
Holmes graduated in History from the University of York in 1978 and before being elected an MP, was a history teacher for 22 years. He gained a PGCE from the University of Sheffield. He taught from 1979–84 at Chesterfield School (now Brookfield Community School), then Buxton College from 1984–90, and from 1990–2001 he was Head of Sixth Form at Buxton Community School (the successor to Buxton College).

Political career
Holmes joined the SDP in 1983. From 1987–95, representing the Liberal Democrats, he was a councillor for Brimington South Ward, then from 1999–2003 for Walton ward on Chesterfield Borough Council. Holmes is currently the lead councillor for the opposition on Chesterfield Borough Council and is a councillor for Barrow Hill and New Whittington ward.

Parliamentary career
His election as chairman of the parliamentary party in 2005 was a surprise to many, since it came at the expense of incumbent chairman Matthew Taylor (a close friend of then Liberal Democrat leader Charles Kennedy). Commentators attributed the result to dissatisfaction with some elements of Kennedy's leadership and a belief amongst MPs that the role of party chairman should be more that of a backbenchers' 'shop steward' and less under the influence of the leadership.

Holmes, not yet an MP, supported Simon Hughes in the leadership election following Paddy Ashdown's retirement in 1999. At the 2005 party conference, he voted against plans by the leadership to support capping the European Union budget at 1% of GDP and to privatise the post office (and was on the winning side in both votes). However, he publicly declared himself to be in full support of Kennedy's leadership following rumours that Hughes was planning a leadership challenge. In the leadership election caused by the resignation of Charles Kennedy, Paul Holmes took on the role of chair to Simon Hughes' leadership campaign

Holmes was a member of the House of Commons Education & Skills Select Committee from 2001–2007, but stood down from the Committee in July 2007 to concentrate on his appointment as Shadow Minister for Housing. Previously Holmes had been a Spokesman on Disability (2001–2005), Work and Pensions (2002–2005) and Arts and Heritage (2006–2007). In December 2007 he returned to the back benches, being one of only two MPs in the party to lose their shadow cabinet responsibilities in the reshuffle following Nick Clegg's election as Liberal Democrat leader.

Holmes hit the headlines in March 2008 when he was the only Liberal Democrat MP to sign an Early Day Motion praising Fidel Castro at the time of his resignation. He was quoted on the BBC as saying "It is true Cuba has political prisoners and no free elections, but it has very good dentistry."

Holmes was the Liberal Democrat Shadow Minister for Justice and sat on the Children, Families and Schools Select Committee.

Holmes is a founding member of the centre-left Beveridge Group within the Liberal Democrats. He is also an Honorary Associate of the National Secular Society and a Distinguished Supporter of Humanists UK, and was also a vice-chair of the All Party Parliamentary Humanist Group, before his defeat in the 2010 general election.

Personal life
In 1978 he married Raelene Palmer. His children were born and brought up in Chesterfield.

See also
 Liberal Democrat frontbench team

References

External links
 Paul Holmes MP official site
 Paul Holmes MP profile at the site of Liberal Democrats
 ePolitix.com – Paul Holmes
 Guardian Unlimited Politics – Ask Aristotle: Paul Holmes MP
 TheyWorkForYou.com – Paul Holmes MP
 The Public Whip – Paul Holmes MP voting record
 BBC News – Paul Holmes profile 10 February 2005
 BBC News – New Lib Dem chairman Interview of Paul Holmes 14 July 2005

1957 births
Alumni of the University of York
Members of the Parliament of the United Kingdom for constituencies in Derbyshire
Liberal Democrats (UK) MPs for English constituencies
Living people
Politicians from Sheffield
People from Chesterfield, Derbyshire
UK MPs 2001–2005
UK MPs 2005–2010
Social Democratic Party (UK) politicians
Liberal Democrats (UK) councillors